Hellenistic portraiture was one of the most innovative features of Hellenistic art. Spurred on by an increased interest in realism, Hellenistic sculptors sought to produce true-to-life portraits defined by the individualism of their subjects. Emergent at this time is a focus on a range of states of mind such as inebriation and concentration, as well as physical characteristics like senescence and anatomical abnormality - in great contrast with the idealised forms of the Classical period

Lysippos

Development of physiognomy

Official portraiture

Gallery

Notes

Bibliography
 Ranuccio Bianchi Bandinelli, Il problema del ritratto, in L'arte classica, Editori Riuniti, Rome 1984.
 Pierluigi De Vecchi and Elda Cerchiari, I tempi dell'arte, volume 1, Bompiani, Milano 1999.

 
Portraiture